Alaköprü Dam is a concrete-face rock-fill dam on the Anamur (Dragon) Creek in Anamur district of Mersin Province, southern Turkey. The development is backed by the Turkish State Hydraulic Works (DSİ). The dam was primarily built as part of the Northern Cyprus Water Supply Project, to supply water for drinking and irrigation to Northern Cyprus.

Preliminary construction on the dam began on November 2, 2010 and the official groundbreaking took place on March 7, 2011. The dam was completed on schedule, on March 7, 2014 but its reservoir did not begin to collect water until February 2015. The dam's 26 MW hydroelectric power station is expected to be commissioned in 2015.

Up to  water from the dam's reservoir, which makes  more than half of its capacity, will be transferred to Geçitköy Dam in Northern Cyprus via an  pipeline crossing the Mediterranean Sea under  depth.

Part of the populated places in the area such as the villages of Sarıağaç, Akine, Çaltıbükü and Ormancık will be submerged in the reservoir of Alaköprü Dam.

See also

List of dams and reservoirs in Turkey

References

Dams in Mersin Province
Concrete-face rock-fill dams
Hydroelectric power stations in Turkey
Dams completed in 2014
2014 establishments in Turkey